The Hungry Moon is a novel by Ramsey Campbell published in 1986.

Plot summary
The Hungry Moon is a novel in which a moorland village has been taken over by authoritarian fundamentalists.

Reception
Dave Langford reviewed The Hungry Moon for White Dwarf #87, and stated that "Definitely a book to make you draw the curtains and turn up the central heating."

Reviews
Review by Fritz Leiber (1986) in Locus, #306 July 1986
Review by Rob Latham (1986) in Fantasy Review, July-August 1986
Review by Stefan Dziemianowicz (1986) in Crypt of Cthulhu, #42 Michaelmas 1986
Review by Jonathan White (1986) in Rod Serling's The Twilight Zone Magazine, October 1986
Review by Charles L. Grant (1986) in American Fantasy, Fall 1986
Review by David Pringle (1988) in Modern Fantasy: The Hundred Best Novels

References

1986 novels